2C-EF is a lesser-known psychedelic drug. It was originally named by Alexander Shulgin as described in his book PiHKAL (Phenethylamines i Have Known And Loved), but he never synthesised it himself, though it has been synthesised and its activity tested in subsequent years.

See also
 2C-T-21
 2C-TFM
 2C-TFE
 DOEF

References

2C (psychedelics)
Entheogens